The 2008 Canadian Mixed Curling Championship was held November 10–16, 2007 at the Calgary Curling Club in Calgary, Alberta. Two members of the winning team  represented Canada at the 2008 World Mixed Doubles Curling Championship.

Teams

Standings

Playoffs
Tie-breaker:  8-5 
Semi-final:  11-5 
Final:  5-4

External links
Event website (web archive)

References

2007 in Alberta
Canadian Mixed Curling Championship
Curling competitions in Calgary
2007 in Canadian curling
November 2007 sports events in Canada